Yasseen Ismail Musa (born August 12, 1980) is a professional basketball player. He plays for Al-Rayyan of the Qatari Basketball League.  He is also a member of the Qatar national basketball team.

Musa competed for the Qatar national basketball team at the 2007 and FIBA Asia Championship 2009.  Previously he competed for the junior national team at the 1999 FIBA World Championship for Junior Men and 2001 FIBA World Championship for Young Men.  At the 1999 tournament, he averaged a tournament-best 25 points per game, ahead of future NBA players Andrei Kirilenko and Juan Carlos Navarro and was the second leading rebounder with 12.4 rebounds per game.

Musa announced his international retirement after Qatar's sixth-placed finish at the FIBA Asia Championship in Manila, The Philippines. However, he is set to continue at this club Al Rayyan for at least two more seasons. In 2014 he was part of the Qatari team that won the FIBA 3x3 World Championships.

References

1980 births
Living people
Qatari men's basketball players
Qatari people of Somali descent
Asian Games medalists in basketball
Basketball players at the 2002 Asian Games
Basketball players at the 2006 Asian Games
Basketball players at the 2010 Asian Games
Basketball players at the 2014 Asian Games
Power forwards (basketball)
Asian Games silver medalists for Qatar
Medalists at the 2006 Asian Games